Tune In, Turn On, Free Tibet is an album by the band Ghost. It was released by Drag City originally in 1999. It was released as a companion album with Snuffbox Immanence.

The album has one cover song of a Pearls Before Swine song.

Track listing
 "We Insist" (Ghost) – 2:33
 "Comin' Home" (Ghost) – 4:11  
 "Way to Shelkar" (Ghost) – 5:16  
 "Images of April" (Pearls Before Swine, Tom Rapp) – 3:09  
 "Lhasalhasa" (Ghost) – 3:28  
 "Remember" (Ghost) – 2:55  
 "Change the World" (Ghost) – 4:41  
 "Tune in, Turn on, Free Tibet" (Ghost) – 33:54

References

1999 albums
Ghost (1984 band) albums
Drag City (record label) albums
Tibetan independence movement